Simone Pianetti  (born 1858) was an Italian anarchist and mass murderer.

Pianetti was born in Camerata Cornello, Lombardy. At a young age, he unsuccessfully attempted to kill his father over a legacy question. For unknown reasons he was not charged and in an agreement with the local chief of the Carabinieri, he left Italy and went to the United States of America. After some years in the US he returned to Italy with a ticket paid for by his father. Back in his village, he married a woman named Carlotta who gave birth to seven children.
Pianetti opened a small restaurant where customers were also allowed to dance. Because the local parish priest and other church people did not agree with dancing in Pianetti's restaurant, the municipality forced him to close it. He subsequently opened an electric-powered mill which was also unsuccessful.

Pianetti was the only person in the village who did not attend church on Sundays. He had grown to think that everyone in Camerata Cornello hated him, which supposedly led him to his killing spree.

The killings 
On the morning of 13 July 1914, Pianetti used his rifle to shoot and kill 7 people:
Domenico Morali, doctor
Abramo Giudici, the manager of the municipality
Valeria Giudici, daughter of the previous
Giovanni Ghilardi, shoemaker
Stefano Filippi, priest
Giovanni Giupponi, a layman.
Caterina Milesi, a farmer

Soon after the killings, Pianetti left the village and reached Monte Cancervo, where he lived for some days, despite a search by 200 people from the Carabinieri, the Polizia di Stato and a company of the 78th infantry regiment. Pianetti fired at some Carabinieri to escape into the mountains near the villages of Olmo al Brembo and Cassiglio. He was never arrested and his body was never found. Pianetti's image enjoyed a positive response among Italian and American anarchists, for his actions against the religious establishment and the bigotry of many, especially those in position of preeminence in the society of the time.

Sources

References 

1858 births
20th-century deaths
People from the Province of Bergamo
Italian assassins
Italian anarchists
Italian mass murderers
Italian spree killers
Year of death missing
1910s mass shootings in Europe
Mass shootings in Italy